JGB is an American rock band led by Melvin Seals, who plays electric organ.  Its mission is to continue the musical legacy of the Jerry Garcia Band, of which Seals was a longtime member.

History
As noted in Rolling Stone, "... when Garcia died in 1995, and the Grateful Dead went on hiatus, Seals took charge. Under his leadership, the slightly renamed 'JGB Band' pays tribute to Garcia by performing his songs and remaining faithful to his style."

In 1996, Seals played several concerts with Jerry Garcia Band bassist John Kahn and other former members of that band.  Their idea was to continue playing the same music with everyone except Garcia himself.  However, Kahn died three weeks later, and Seals and the others continued without him.  The membership of JGB has continued to evolve over the years.

On July 30, 2004, Melvin Seals was the first Jerry Garcia Band member to headline an outdoor music and camping festival named in honor of Jerry Garcia, called Grateful Garcia Gathering. Jerry Garcia Band drummer David Kemper joined Melvin Seals & JGB in 2007. To date, other musicians playing with JGB have included Donna Jean Godchaux, Mookie Siegel, Pete Sears, G. E. Smith, Barry Sless, Ozzie Ahlers and Robin Sylvester.

Discography 
Welcome to Our World (For Members Only) – 1998
Keepers of the Flame – 2006

References

External links 
 JGB official website
 Melvin Seals official website
 JGB collection at the Internet Archive's live music archive

American rock music groups
Jam bands
Jerry Garcia